The uninhabited little island of Balmer Werder lies in the Baltic Sea, in the Balmer See, the southeastern part of the Achterwasser lagoon, between Usedom and the mainland off the village of Balm. Balm belongs to the municipality of Benz in the county of Vorpommern-Greifswald in the German state of Mecklenburg-Vorpommern.

The Balmer Werder, along with the smaller island of Böhmke, lies within a nature reserve, established in 1967, in Usedom Island Nature Park.

Islands of Mecklenburg-Western Pomerania
German islands in the Baltic
Usedom
Uninhabited islands of Germany